Kiersten Roan Dallstream (born March 5, 1988) is an American retired professional soccer player from Fountain Hills, Arizona. She played as a defender for Reign FC of the National Women's Soccer League (NWSL). She previously played for the Boston Breakers of Women's Professional Soccer (WPS) as a defender, as well as the United States U-20 women's national soccer team.

Early life
Born in Kirksville, Missouri, Dallstream later attended West Chester East High School in West Chester, Pennsylvania, earning one letter in soccer. She was named All-ChesMont League and earned all-conference second team honors her freshman year. After moving to Fountain Hills, Arizona, she attended Fountain Hills High School for the remainder of her high school career. As a member of the '88 Sereno Golden Eagles White Club team, she earned three Arizona state titles. The team also won the 2003 Region IV championship and finished second nationally the same year. She was also a member of the Arizona Olympic Development Program (ODP) team.

Washington State University

Dallstream attended Washington State University and finished her collegiate career third all-time in goals scored (30) for the Cougars women's soccer team as well as third in  multiple-goal matches (6), points (76), game-winning goals (7), and assists (16). She ranked fourth in shots (198), sixth in matches played (75) and eighth in matches started (72).

During her freshman year, she was selected to participate in the United States U-20 women's national soccer team training camp and recorded a season-high six shots. As a sophomore in 2007, she started all 19 matches, scored 10 goals (then tied for eighth on the Cougar single-season list), and added four assists. Her three game-winning goals tied for seventh on WSU's single-season list. She was named All-West Region by Soccer Buzz as well as to the All-Pac-10 First Team and received an All-Pac-10 Academic honorable mention.  During her junior year, Dallstream appeared in 16 matches, started 13 and led team with five assists. She was also a member of U.S. team that won gold medal at the 2008 FIFA U-20 Women's World Cup.

As a senior, Dallstream started all 22 matches and led the Cougars with 13 goals, seven assists (tying for team lead in assists), and 33 points. Her goals and assists tied for fourth on WSU single-season list and points were third. Her three game-winning goals tied for seventh on Cougar single-season list. Dallstream scored a point in 10-straight matches from September 3 – October 16, the second-longest streak in school history. She was a Pacific-10 Conference medal winner, an NSCAA Scholar Athlete Second Team University Division and First Team West Region. She was named Soccer America Second Team Pacific Region and All-Pac-10 Second Team.

Playing career

Club

Sky Blue FC, 2010
Dallstream was selected ninth overall in the 2010 WPS Draft by the Los Angeles Sol. When the Sol ceased operations, Dallstream was allocated to Sky Blue FC in the 2010 WPS Dispersal Draft. She made 12 appearances for the team during the 2010 season, playing a total of 567 minutes.

Boston Breakers, 2011

In April 2011, Dallstream was traded to the Boston Breakers. She made four appearances for the team, playing a total of 212 minutes.

Seattle Reign FC, 2013–2019
Dallstream signed with the Seattle Reign FC for the inaugural season of the NWSL in 2013. She played in 20 of the team's 22 matches during the 2013 season, tallying a total of 1,296 minutes on the defensive line.

Dallstream returned to the Reign for the 2014 season. The team set a league record unbeaten streak of 16 games during the first part of the season. During the 16 game stretch, the Reign compiled a 13–0–3 record. The Reign finished first in the regular season clinching the NWSL Shield for the first time. After defeating the Washington Spirit 2–1 in the playoff semi-finals, the Reign were defeated 2–1 by FC Kansas City during the championship final. Dallstream finished the 2014 season with one assist. She started in 8 of the 15 games in which she played.

Dallstream retired in July 2019.

International
Dallstream was a member of the United States U-20 women's national soccer team that won the 2008 FIFA U-20 Women's World Cup in Chile, serving as a defender. She started in the first match against France. Dallstream later suffered a knee injury during the United States' third match versus China and was replaced at right back by Elli Reed for the rest of the tournament.

In July 2009, Dallstream received her first call-up to the United States U-23 women's national soccer team, and had one assist in her first and only game with the U-23s to date.

See also
 List of Washington State University people
 List of Seattle Reign FC players

References

External links

 
 Seattle Reign FC player profile
 Washington State player profile
 US Soccer profile
 
 

1988 births
Living people
People from Fountain Hills, Arizona
Sportspeople from the Phoenix metropolitan area
Soccer players from Arizona
American women's soccer players
Women's association football forwards
Women's association football defenders
Washington State Cougars women's soccer players
Washington State University alumni
Arizona Rush players
NJ/NY Gotham FC players
Boston Breakers players
Boston Aztec (WPSL) players
OL Reign players
National Women's Soccer League players
Women's Premier Soccer League players
United States women's under-20 international soccer players
Women's Professional Soccer players